The 2018 WGC-Dell Technologies Match Play was the 20th WGC Match Play, played March 21–25 at Austin Country Club in Austin, Texas. It was the second of four World Golf Championships in 2018.

Field
The field consisted of the top 64 players available from the Official World Golf Ranking on March 11. However, the seedings were based on the World Rankings on March 18.

Justin Rose (ranked 5th on March 12, personal reasons), Rickie Fowler (7th, personal reasons), Brooks Koepka (8th, wrist injury), Henrik Stenson (15th, personal reasons), Adam Scott (56th, personal reasons), and Joost Luiten (67th, wrist injury) did not compete, allowing entry for Kevin Na (ranked 65th), Charles Howell III (66th), Keegan Bradley (68th), Luke List (69th), and Julian Suri (70th).

Format
In 2014 and earlier editions, the championship was a single elimination match play event. A new format was introduced in 2015, and the championship now starts with pool play, with 16 groups of four players playing round-robin matches, on Wednesday through Friday. The top 16 seeded players are allocated to the 16 groups, one in each group. The remaining 48 players are placed into three pools (seeds 17–32, seeds 33–48, seeds 49–64). Each group has one player randomly selected from each pool to complete the group.

All group play matches are limited to 18 holes with one point awarded for a win and one-half point for a halved match. Only one player advances to the weekend from each of the 16 groupings. After all 3 rounds are played, if 2 or more players are tied for first place in their group, then they play a sudden-death stroke play playoff, beginning on hole 1 and moving beyond if necessary.

The winners of each group advance to a single-elimination bracket on the weekend, with the round of 16 and quarterfinals on Saturday, and the semi-finals, finals, and consolation match on Sunday.

Rank – Official World Golf Ranking on March 19, 2018.

Results

Pool play
Players were divided into 16 groups of four players and played round-robin matches Wednesday to Friday.
Round 1 – March 21    
Round 2 – March 22     
Round 3 – March 23

Final 16 bracket

Prize money breakdown

 Source:

References

External links

Coverage on the European Tour's official site
Austin Country Club

WGC Match Play
Golf in Texas
Sports in Austin, Texas
WGC-Dell Technologies Match Play Championship
WGC-Dell Technologies Match Play Championship
WGC-Dell Technologies Match Play Championship
WGC-Dell Technologies Match Play Championship